Darren Dalcher is Professor in Strategic Project Management at Lancaster University Management School and Director of the National Centre for Project Management (NCPM) in the UK. He holds a PhD in Software Engineering from King's College London.

He is involved in organising international conferences, and has delivered many keynote addresses and tutorials, including PMexpo, BIS conference and others.

Honours
Fellow of the APM
Fellow, British Computer Society
Member, Project Management Institute,
Member,  Academy of Management,
Member, Institute for Electrical and Electronics Engineers,
Member, Association for Computing Machinery.
Member of the PMI Advisory Board responsible for the David I. Cleland project management award and of the APM Professional Development Board.
Named Academic of the Year by Project magazine,
Named one of the top 10 "movers and shapers" in project management in 2008 by the Association for Project Management

References 

British computer scientists
Living people
Year of birth missing (living people)
Academics of Middlesex University
Alumni of King's College London